The A J Scahill Stakes is a Perth Racing Group 3 Thoroughbred horse race held under Weight for Age conditions, for horses aged three years old and upwards, over a distance of 1,400 metres at Ascot Racecourse, Perth Western Australia in December.  Prizemoney is A$1,500,000.

History

The race is named for Allan J. Scahill (1901–2000), who served on the Committee of the Western Australian Turf Club from 1953 to 1975 and was vice chairman in 1975. Scahill was also a founding member of the Western Australian Totalisator Agency Board.

In 2003 the race was run at Belmont Park Racecourse.

Distance
1978–1979 – 1200 metres
1980–1982 – 1400 metres
1983 – 1450 metres
1984 onwards - 1400 metres

Grade
1978 - Principal race
1979 onwards - Group 3

Winners

 2022 - The Astrologist
2021 - Valour Road
2020 - Kementari
2019 - The Celt
2018 - Arcadia Prince
2017 - Silverstream
2016 - Vega Magic
2015 - Watermans Bay
2014 - Watermans Bay
2013 - Conservatorium
2012 - Power Princess
2011 - Grand Nirvana
2010 - Waratah's Secret
2009 - Proart
2008 - Takeover Target
2007 - Tarzi
2006 - Marasco
2005 - Arctic Park
2004 - Avenida Madero
2003 - Hot Shot Brother
2002 - Kensyl Bay
2001 - Lizzy Long Legs
2001 - Tribula
2000 - Terwilliger
1999 - Double Blue
1998 - Willoughby
1997 - Bold Extreme
1996 - Island Morn
1995 - Calypso
1994 - Brave Kite
1993 - Yilgangie Gold
1992 - Pago Escort
1991 - Strip The Moon
1990 - Medicine Kid
1989 - Westall
1988 - Miss Muffet
1987 - King Phoenix
1986 - Heron Bridge
1985 - Eastern Temple
1984 - Hanging In
1983 - Haulpak's Image

See also

 List of Australian Group races
 Group races

References

Horse races in Australia
Open sprint category horse races
Sport in Perth, Western Australia